Nan Desu Kan (NDK) is an annual three-day anime convention held during September at the Gaylord Rockies Resort & Convention Center in Aurora, Colorado. The convention is the largest anime convention in the Rocky Mountain region and each one takes eighteen months to plan. Its name in Japanese roughly means , "what is it?". The parent company, Rocky Mountain Anime Association, is a registered 501(c)(4) nonprofit organization.

Programming
The convention typically offers an anime music video contest, art showings and auctions, cultural panels, dances, dealer's room, games, masquerade, musical guests, screenings of anime, and workshops. NDK at one time hosted a contest for attendees who decorate their atrium hotel rooms, with the winners receiving a free hotel room. The convention has held various fundraisers since 2000 to support organizations that include: American Diabetes Association, American Red Cross, Child's Play, Japan America Society of Colorado, Susan G. Komen Foundation, and the United Way Gulf Recovery Fund (2010). In 2012, $12,000 was raised for the Aurora Victim Relief Fund and other charities. The 2015 charity fundraiser was a poker tournament for Dumb Friends League. The conventions tabletop and video gaming room runs 24 hours during the event.

History
Prior to 2000 the convention was known as Nan Desu Kon. Renovations in the hotel were still underway prior to the start in 2003, but did not affect the convention. The convention chose not to move to the Colorado Convention Center due to attendee logistic issues (hotels, money, and parking). The convention instituted an attendance cap of 7,500 per day in 2011 due to event quality and attendee comfort concerns. The attendance cap of 7,500 per day continued into 2012 and the convention was a sellout. The convention added the Hilton Garden Inn DTC hotel in 2013, occurred during the 2013 Colorado floods, and attendance remained capped at 7,500 attendees. Along with the flooding the fire alarm went off, tornado warnings occurred, long lines occurred, and the masquerade had to be stopped due to a medical emergency. The convention also hosted the World Cosplay Summit Mountain Qualifiers with Green Jello Cosplay winning.

Nan Desu Kan moved from the Marriott Denver Tech Center to Sheraton Denver Downtown Hotel in 2015 due to growth and included an expanded dealers room. Nan Desu Kan 2020 was cancelled due to the COVID-19 pandemic. In 2021, the convention moved to the Gaylord Rockies Resort & Convention Center.

Event history

Other events
On August 8, 2004 the convention held a CosPlay Dance Party at the Rock Island Night Club in Denver, Colorado. In 2011, Nan Desu Kan organized a benefit for the Japanese Red Cross named Rave2Save. The event was held on Saturday April 30, 2011 at the Marriott Denver Tech Center, which donated the Evergreen Ballroom, and funds raised at the event were matched by the Rocky Mountain Anime Association. The event raised $13,440.

References

External links
 Nan Desu Kan official website
 Rocky Mountain Anime Association official website

Anime conventions in the United States
Recurring events established in 1997
1997 establishments in Colorado
Annual events in Colorado
Festivals in Colorado
Tourist attractions in Colorado
Conventions in Colorado
Culture of Aurora, Colorado